Dunhuang Museum is a museum in Dunhuang, Gansu, China. It contains a number of Chinese and Tibetan items such as manuscripts from Cave 17 of  Mogao Caves, and domestic items.

See also
 List of museums in China

References

Museums in Gansu
Dunhuang